Carl E. Gardner was an American percussionist, drum maker, and method book author.

Career
Carlton Edward Gardner was born in 1885 in Massachusetts. He published a book called Music Composition sometime before his book on music theory, Essentials of Music Theory, in 1912. Gardner was the timpanist for the Boston Symphony Orchestra from 1915-1920. During this time he also published a rudimental drumming manual called The Military Drummer (1918), which was "indorsed [sic] by the U.S. Army and Navy authorities," Music Composition: A New Method of Harmony (1918), and The Gardner Modern Method for the Instruments of Percussion (1919).  In 1919, Gardner partnered with BSO trombonist Fortunato Sordillo  to form the Sordillo-Gardner Music Company, which manufactured Gardner-designed Free Tension Drums. After leaving the Symphony in 1920, Gardner helped form the Boston Society of Musical Instrument Manufacturers in 1922. In 1925, he contributed to Carl Fischer's Drum Fife and Bugle Corps Leaflets along with Francis Findlay and W.A. Maynard. 3 of the 8 lessons in the leaflets were on the snare drum and each leaflet cost 10 cents. Gardner wrote several volumes of Progressive Studies for the Snare Drum, the first of which was published in 1928.   Gardner was the program director for the Music Supervisor's National Band Conference Band Festival at Boston Commons at least 4 times, the 4th being in 1928. He went on to serve as the Supervisor of Bands and Orchestras for Boston Public Schools in the 1920s, 1930s   and 1940s, where he taught :de:Joe Cocuzzo. Gardner published a timpani method in 1944, a percussion method in 1945 called Drums, Cymbals, Accessories, and a book called Reading Lessons for the First Year Drummer in 1950. His book Modern Method for Bells, Xylophone, Marimba, and Chimes is a recommended volume for teachers  of percussion.

Publications
All of Gardner's publications were released with Carl Fischer Music
Music Composition
Essentials of Music Theory
The Military Drummer
Music Composition: A New Method of Harmony
The Gardner Modern Method for the Instruments of Percussion
Carl Fischer's Drum Fife and Bugle Corps Leaflets
Progressive Studies for the Snare Drum Book 1 - Elementary
Progressive Studies for the Snare Drum Book 2 - Intermediate
Progressive Studies for the Snare Drum Book III - Advanced
Progressive Studies for the Snare Drum Book IV - Post-Graduate
The Gardner Method for the Timpani
Drums, Cymbals, Accessories
Reading Lessons for the First Year Drummer
Modern Method for Bells, Xylophone, Marimba, and Chimes

References 

1885 births
20th-century American drummers
American male drummers
20th-century American male musicians
Year of death missing